South Somercotes is a village and civil parish  north-east from Louth and approximately  south from North Somercotes, Lincolnshire, England. The civil parish includes the hamlet of Scupholme.

The former Anglican church is dedicated to St Peter and is often called the "Queen of the Marsh" due to its lofty spire serving as a landmark for seaman.

The ecclesiastical parish is shared with North Somercotes and is part of the Somercotes and Grainthorpe with Conisholme group of the Deanery of Louthesk, Diocese of Lincoln. The incumbent (2013) is the Revd Sue Allison.

History
The parish church of St Peter dates back to approximately 1200, but the present fabric is from the 14th to 16th centuries, and was heavily restored in 1866 and 1896.  It is constructed of limestone, greenstone and ironstone coursed rubble, with some limestone ashlar from the later restorations. Declared redundant, it is now cared for by the Churches Conservation Trust.

References

External links

Village web site

Villages in Lincolnshire
Civil parishes in Lincolnshire
East Lindsey District